Kujdanowiaspis is an extinct genus of actinolepid placoderm from the Early Devonian of Nyrkiv, Ukraine and Poland. As an actinolepid, it is among the most basal of all placoderms. Kujdanowiaspis is only known from many well-preserved fragmentary head shield and skull fossils. After revising the genus in 2010, Dupret left three species within the genus: K. buczacziensis, K. podolica and possibly also K. zychi.

Description

Because of the consistently poor preservation of Kujdanowiaspis fossils, little is known about its physiology. What is known about it is typical of Actinolepid placoderms, and it could be compared to the better known primitive arthrodires such as Dicksonosteus or Actinolepis. It had a very pronounced, serrated spinal plate, giving it an almost lunate dorsal silhouette.

Its body is wide and flat, suggesting a benthic lifestyle. Its jaws were comparatively underdeveloped in comparison to the more robust-jawed arthrodires that would come after it, such as Dunkleosteus and Coccosteus, indicating that it likely subsisted primarily on smaller, softer-bodied animals such as mollusks or worms instead of larger, tougher prey animals.

References 

Devonian placoderms
Arthrodires
Placoderm families
Early Devonian first appearances
Early Devonian extinctions